Lewiston is a census-designated place (CDP) in Trinity County, California, United States. Its population is 1,222 as of the 2020 census, up from 1,193 from the 2010 census.

Geography
Lewiston is located at  (40.699213, -122.810684).

Climate
According to the Köppen Climate Classification system, Lewiston has a hot-summer Mediterranean climate, abbreviated "Csa" on climate maps. It experiences hot summers and cool winters with great diurnal temperature variation.

History
A post office called Lewiston has been in operation since 1854. The community was named after Benjamin Franklin Lewis, adopted son of town founder Tom Palmer, who with Lewis ran a gold mining operation on the Trinity River in the early days of the Gold Rush.

Demographics

2010
The 2010 United States Census reported that Lewiston had a population of 1,193. The racial makeup of Lewiston was 1,074 (90.0%) White, 8 (0.7%) African American, 37 (3.1%) Native American, 6 (0.5%) Asian, 5 (0.4%) Pacific Islander, 21 (1.8%) from other races, and 42 (3.5%) from two or more races. Hispanic or Latino of any race were 78 persons (6.5%).

The Census reported that 1,193 people (100% of the population) lived in households, 0 (0%) lived in non-institutionalized group quarters, and 0 (0%) were institutionalized.

There were 553 households, out of which 112 (20.3%) had children under the age of 18 living in them, 267 (48.3%) were opposite-sex married couples living together, 45 (8.1%) had a female householder with no husband present, 20 (3.6%) had a male householder with no wife present.  There were 44 (8.0%) unmarried opposite-sex partnerships, and 3 (0.5%) same-sex married couples or partnerships. 177 households (32.0%) were made up of individuals, and 63 (11.4%) had someone living alone who was 65 years of age or older. The average household size was 2.16.  There were 332 families (60.0% of all households); the average family size was 2.70.

The population was spread out, with 202 people (16.9%) under the age of 18, 63 people (5.3%) aged 18 to 24, 212 people (17.8%) aged 25 to 44, 459 people (38.5%) aged 45 to 64, and 257 people (21.5%) who were 65 years of age or older.  The median age was 51.4 years. For every 100 females, there were 102.2 males.  For every 100 females age 18 and over, there were 100.6 males.

The homeowner vacancy rate was 3.5%; the rental vacancy rate was 10.2%.  838 people (70.2% of the population) lived in owner-occupied housing units and 355 people (29.8%) lived in rental housing units.

2000
As of the census of 2000, there were 1,305 people, 542 households, and 388 families residing in the CDP. There were 654 housing units at an average density of 18.9 per square mile (7.3/km2). The racial makeup of the CDP was 89.89% White, 0.23% African American, 2.61% Native American, 0.69% Asian, 0.15% Pacific Islander, 1.76% from other races, and 4.67% from two or more races. Hispanic or Latino of any race were 5.67% of the population.

There were 542 households, out of which 28.2% had children under the age of 18 living with them, 56.3% were married couples living together, 9.4% had a female householder with no husband present, and 28.4% were non-families. 24.2% of all households were made up of individuals, and 11.6% had someone living alone who was 65 years of age or older.  The average household size was 2.41 and the average family size was 2.82.

In the CDP, the population was spread out, with 24.5% under the age of 18, 4.0% from 18 to 24, 21.2% from 25 to 44, 32.4% from 45 to 64, and 17.9% who were 65 years of age or older.  The median age was 45 years. For every 100 females, there were 102.0 males.  For every 100 females age 18 and over, there were 103.5 males.

The median income for a household in the CDP was $30,500, and the median income for a family was $33,889. Males had a median income of $31,667 versus $20,000 for females. The per capita income for the CDP was $16,214.  About 16.5% of families and 20.2% of the population were below the poverty line, including 31.5% of those under age 18 and 5.0% of those age 65 or over.

Government

Significant sites and events
 Lewiston is home to California's third largest reservoir, the Trinity Dam
 The Trinity River flows through the heart of Lewiston, directly under the Old Lewiston Bridge
 Lewiston Lake is located along Trinity Dam Boulevard and is considered primarily a fishing and camping area, only ventured into as a swimming destination for those who can withstand the frigid water.
 Just above Lewiston Lake and Trinity Dam, Trinity Lake is located. It is a popular summer time destination, great for fishing, camping, boating, and swimming.
 Every November, after Thanksgiving, the town hosts a Holiday Bridge Lighting where there is a fireworks display, the bridge is adorned in Christmas lights, there are booths from local vendors and school fundraisers, and Santa crosses the bridge allowing youngsters to take their picture with him.

See also
Trinity County, California

References

Census-designated places in Trinity County, California
Census-designated places in California